Wang Yeping (born 12 February 1928) is a Chinese politician who is the widow of Jiang Zemin, former General Secretary of the Chinese Communist Party (de facto paramount leader) and President of the People's Republic of China (de jure head of state), and is a native of Yangzhou, Jiangsu.

Biography (1928-present)
Wang Yeping was born February 12, 1928, in Yangzhou and grew up in Shanghai in the Republic of China. Wang Yeping graduated from Shanghai Foreign Language Institute and majored in foreign languages. She has two sons, Jiang Mianheng born in 1951 and Jiang Miankang born in 1956.

References

1928 births
Living people
Jiang Zemin family